The Saint-Jean River (in French: rivière Saint-Jean) flows through the municipalities of Sainte-Louise (MRC of L'Islet Regional County Municipality), as well as Saint-Onésime-d'Ixworth and La Pocatière, in the Kamouraska Regional County Municipality, in the administrative region of Bas-Saint-Laurent, in Quebec, in Canada.

Toponymy 
The toponym Rivière Saint-Jean was formalized on December 5, 1968, by the Commission de toponymie du Québec.

See also 

 List of rivers of Quebec

References 

Rivers of Bas-Saint-Laurent
L'Islet Regional County Municipality
Kamouraska Regional County Municipality
Rivers of Chaudière-Appalaches